Carolina Brewery is a beer brewery and restaurant/pub with locations in Chapel Hill and Pittsboro, North Carolina. Carolina Brewery has drawn international attention for its handcrafted beers. Founded in 1995, Carolina Brewery is the oldest brewery in the Triangle area. It was one of the first craft breweries in North Carolina. The restaurant serves contemporary American cuisine and features a seasonal menu.

Awards
Copperline Amber Ale
2020 Best in Show, NC Craft Brewers Guild
Gold Medal, World Beer Championships
Sky Blue Kölsch
2020 First Place for Alternative Fermentation, NC Craft Brewers Guild
Silver Medal World Beer Championships
Flagship India Pale Ale
Gold Medal, 2006 Great American Beer Festival
Best Brewpub in the Southeast by Brewpub Magazine
Best Overall Brewery at Hopfest 2004
Best Burger in the Triangle by Independent Magazine and the readers of The Daily Tar Heel.

Beers Available Year-Round
Carolina Brewery offers four beers year-round in 6- and 12-packs at retailers and on draft at Carolina Brewery's brewery restaurants and at other restaurants and bars:
Sky Blue Kolsch
Copperline Amber Ale
American IPA
Costero Mexican Lager

Limited Edition Seasonal Specials
Carolina Brewery offers rotating selection of draft beer at Carolina Brewery's brewery restaurants and at other restaurants and bars"

 Dogwood Citrus Ale
 Oatmeal Porter
 Czech Pilsner
 Oktoberfest
 Santa's Secret

References

External links 
Carolina Brewery

Citations 

Restaurants in North Carolina
Buildings and structures in Chapel Hill-Carrboro, North Carolina
Beer brewing companies based in North Carolina
Restaurants established in 1995
1995 establishments in North Carolina